Max Oskar von Bonsdorff (23 August 1882 – 12 February 1967) was a Finnish prelate who became the first Bishop of Borgå in Finland in 1923.

Early life and career
Max von Bonsdorff was born on 23 August 1882 in Turku, Grand Duchy of Finland in the Russian Empire, the son of Alfred Oskar von Bonsdorff and Aina Augusta Ahlstedt. His family were part of the Finnish and Swedish lower nobility. He was ordained priest in 1910 and undertook a doctoral degree at the University of Helsinki in 1923. Prior to his time as a bishop, he was a lecturer in Vyborg and Turku. He also served as a vicar to the Swedish congregation in Helsinki between 1921 and 1923.

Bishop
In 1923 the Diocese of Borgå or Porvoo in Finnish, was created to serve the Swedish population in Finland and he was elected as its first bishop. He was consecrated on 25 November 1923 and installed as the first bishop on 1 December.

Written works
Some of von Bonsdorff's writings include:
Zur Predigttätigkeit des Johannes Chrysostomus (1922, väitöskirja)
Motsatser i kristendomslivet (1924)
Herman Råbergh (1957)

References 

1882 births
1967 deaths
People from Turku
Finnish Lutheran bishops
20th-century Finnish nobility
Max